Francis Goolden (1885–1950) was a Royal Navy officer who served during the First and Second World Wars.

He commanded the light cruiser  in 1926–1927 and then commanded the heavy cruiser  in 1934–1937. Goolden retired in 1937, but was recalled to active duty when the Second World War began in 1939 to command the training base HMS Ganges in 1939–1940.

Citations

Bibliography
 

1885 births
1950 deaths
Royal Navy admirals of World War II
Royal Navy officers of World War I
Royal Navy officers of World War II